Mões is a civil parish in the municipality of Castro Daire, Portugal. The population in 2011 was 1,837, in an area of 44.15 km2.

References

Freguesias of Castro Daire